Sangdil Sanam is a 1994 Indian Hindi-language film directed by Shomu Mukherjee. The film stars Salman Khan and Manisha Koirala. It was released on 16 December 1994. The film was a box office failure.

Synopsis
Kailashnath is the manager of a bank who lives a comfortable lifestyle with his wife Savitri and son Kishan. He is friendly with the Bank Watchman, Shankar Dayal Khurana, so much so that he arranges the engagement of Kishan with Shankar's daughter, Sanam. During the engagement, Shankar goes to the bank and robs money. Kailashnath becomes a suspect. Savitri and Kishan are advised by Shankar to go far away because people were protesting against the family, Kailashnath is arrested, charged, and sentenced to 12 years in prison.

After he completes his sentence he returns home to find that Savitri and Kishan are not traceable. He also finds out that he was framed for the bank robbery by none other than Shankar, who is now the Mayor of this town. In the meantime, Kishan, now grown up and is the village's heartthrob, goes to the city and brings Sanam home with him as his bride. Sanam, now a spoilt girl who hates poor people, refuses to marry Kishan. Kishan is not aware that Sanam is to be married to Pradeep, the only son of millionaire Lalla.

Lalla and Pradeep are poor but act as millionaires to get money from Sanam's father and they then sell her to a woman trafficker. Sanam intends to publicly humiliate Kishan on her Engagement Day with Pradeep. But Kishan kidnaps her, with an aim of hurting her pride and go along with making her his wife. Kishan and Sanam stay in a jungle, Sanam escapes and goes to a temple where free food is being distributed to the poor, Kishan arrives and is taking her back when he sees an old man (Kailashnath) not realising that he is his father.

He wishes them to stay happy and together, although Sanam is not happy. Kishan brings Sanam home to his mother as his bride. His mother gets very happy and invites the whole village to celebrate. Within the guests is a village girl who likes Kishan and her mother. They get angry and jealous since they brought a bride from the city and didn't marry her. As the guests are talking, Sanam comes out of the room dressed improperly and dances. This causes great shame for Kishan and his mother. After the guests, leave Kishan hits Sanam (although she laughs) and leaves her in the rain. In the morning, the village has decided that they want Kishan's wife to leave the village as they don't want their daughters to learn nudity from her. Kishan agrees to them.

On the other hand, Sanam had been in the rain the whole night and she has a fever. Kishan's mother asks him to help her recover (although he hates her now for destroying his family's reputation in front of the village) as he is the one who caused this. Kishan has to agree. He helps her recover and takes care of her day and night. Upon seeing this, Sanam recalls their marriage and now starts to like Kishan. On the other hand, Kailashnath breaks in Shankar's house with a gun to kill him for betraying him.

Meanwhile, Pradeep enters the house and deals with Kailashnath as Shankar goes to bring his daughter back. When he reaches Kishan's house, he asks the inspector to arrest him, but Sanam tells the inspector that according to the law, she is an adult and can marry whomever she wants, so Kishan should not be arrested. She also threatens her Dad to arrest him as he entered her house without permission. Shankar gets really sad now, but can't do anything. Kishan is happy as Sanam has turned into "Munni" (Sanam's childhood name).

Cast
Salman Khan as Kishan 
Manisha Koirala as Sanam
Alok Nath as Kailashnath
Reema Lagoo as Savitri
Kiran Kumar as Shankar Dayal Khurana 
Raza Murad as Daman / Chamda Dada 
Ashok Saraf as Balchandra
Shiva Rindani as Sher Khan Pathan
Anand Balraj as Prince
Pradeep Rawat as Pradeep
Avtaar Gill as Pradeep's Father
Shashi Puri as Police Commissioner
Kishore Bhanushali as Amar
Raju Shrestha as Anthony
 Baby Princy as young Childhood Sanam

Soundtrack
The music was scored by Anand–Milind and the lyrics were written by Sameer. The song "One Two Three" was used in the 2014 Bollywood film Haider.

References

External links

1994 films
1990s Hindi-language films
Films scored by Anand–Milind
Films directed by Shomu Mukherjee